Jerzy Michał Łucki (24 September 1898 – 18 September 1939) was a Polish bobsledder, military officer and athlete. He competed in the four-man event at the 1928 Winter Olympics.

Łucki was a military officer, serving initially in the Polish Legions, then in the Polish Army. He was an active athlete in his military unit and the Pogoń Lwów athletics team, winning the bronze medal at the Polish Athletics Championships twice in shot put (1923, 1927) and once in hammer throw (1923).

After the Soviet invasion of Poland he fought in the defence of Lwów. Łucki most likely died on 18 September 1939 in Kuty, Stanisławów Voivodeship, while evacuating his unit over the border to Romania. He was awarded the Cross of Independence.

References

1898 births
1939 deaths
Polish male bobsledders
Polish male shot putters
Polish male discus throwers
Polish male hammer throwers
Polish military officers
Olympic bobsledders of Poland
Bobsledders at the 1928 Winter Olympics
People from Drohobych
People from the Kingdom of Galicia and Lodomeria
Polish legionnaires (World War I)
Recipients of the Cross of Independence
Polish military personnel killed in World War II